Hannah Gill and The Hours is an American pop, pop rock, blues and soul band fronted by singer Hannah Gill.
Hannah Gill is a jazz musician who has collaborated with Postmodern Jukebox and rose to fame after the collaboration.

The band's debut album, The Water, was released in 2016, when Gill was just 18 years old.

References

External links

American pop music groups
American pop rock music groups
American blues musical groups
American soul musical groups